The 2014–15 Cleveland Cavaliers season was the 45th season of the franchise in the National Basketball Association (NBA).  The season was marked by the publicity the team received by signing free agent forward LeBron James and trading for forward Kevin Love.  These All-Star players, added with All-Star guard Kyrie Irving, were dubbed nationally as the "Big Three". With these acquisitions, this formed a new superteam of LeBron James, Kyrie Irving, and Kevin Love in the East.

A sub-.500 team the previous four seasons, the Cavaliers won the Central division with a 53–29 record. After a slow 19–20 start, including a stretch of 2–10 in 12 games, a number of trades turned the season around, and they finished 34–9 the rest of the way. Despite losing key players to injuries, their run continued deep in the NBA Playoffs, starting with a sweep of the Boston Celtics in four games in the First Round, then defeating the Chicago Bulls in six games in the Semi-finals, before sweeping the top-seeded Atlanta Hawks in four games in the Conference Finals, making it to the NBA Finals, their second appearance since 2007. However, the Cavaliers' season ended with a 2–4 series loss to the Golden State Warriors in the NBA Finals, who won their fourth NBA championship, their first NBA Championship in 40 years.

Offseason
In July 2014, LeBron James signed with the Cavaliers and Kevin Love was acquired through a 3-team trade in August. With these acquisitions, this formed a new superteam of LeBron James, Kyrie Irving, and Kevin Love in the East.

Draft picks

Roster

Roster Notes
Center Anderson Varejão played 26 games (his last game being on December 23, 2014) but missed the majority of the season and the playoffs due to tearing his left Achilles tendon. He underwent successful surgery at the Cleveland Clinic on December 26, 2014.

Preseason

|- style="background:#bfb;"
| 1
| October 5
6:00 pm
| Maccabi Tel Aviv
| 
| Kyrie Irving (16)
| Anderson Varejão (15)
| Kyrie Irving (5)
| Quicken Loans Arena20,562
| 1–0
|- style="background:#bfb;"
| 2
| October 11
5:00 pm
<small>ESPNews
| @ Miami
| 
| Kevin Love (25)
| Tristan Thompson (9)
| LeBron James (8)
| HSBC Arena15,411
| 2–0
|- style="background:#bfb;"
| 3
| October 14
7:00 pm
| Milwaukee
| 
| Kevin Love (25)
| Shawn Marion (7)
| Matthew Dellavedova (9)
| Quicken Loans Arena19,102
| 3–0
|- style="background:#bfb;"
| 4
| October 15
7:00 pm
| Indiana
| 
| LeBron James (26)
| Tristan Thompson (9)
| Matthew Dellavedova (4)
| Cintas Center10,250
| 4–0
|- style="background:#fcc;"
| 5
| October 17
7:30 pm
| Dallas
| 
| Kyrie Irving (23)
| Tristan Thompson (11)
| Kyrie Irving (5)
| Quicken Loans Arena20,562
| 4–1
|- style="background:#bfb;"
| 6
| October 20
7:00 pm
| Chicago
| 
| Kyrie Irving (28)
| Kevin Love (13)
| Kyrie Irving (7)
| Schottenstein Center19,049
| 5-1
|- style="background:#fcc;"
| 7
| October 22
8:00 pm
| @ Memphis
| 
| Kyrie Irving (16)
| Kevin Love (8)
| A.J. Price & Matthew Dellavedova (4)
| FedExForum12,073
| 5–2

Regular season

Standings

Game log

|- style="background:#fcc;"
| 1
| October 30
8:00 pm
| New York
| 
| Kyrie Irving (22)
| Kevin Love (14)
| Kyrie Irving (7)
| Quicken Loans Arena20,562
| 0–1
|- style="background:#cfc;"
| 2
| October 31
8:00 pm
| @ Chicago
| 
| LeBron James (36)
| Kevin Love (16)
| LeBron James (4)
| United Center22,879
| 1–1

|- style="background:#fcc;"
| 3
| November 4
10:00 pm
| @ Portland
| 
| Kevin Love (22)
| Kevin Love (10)
| LeBron James (10)
| Moda Center 19,441
| 1–2
|- style="background:#fcc;"
| 4
| November 5
9:00 pm
| @ Utah
| 
| Kyrie Irving (34)
| Kevin Love (8)
| LeBron James (4)
| EnergySolutions Arena 19,911
| 1–3
|- style="background:#cfc;"
| 5
| November 7
10:30 pm
| @ Denver
| 
| LeBron James (22)
| Anderson Varejão (9)
| LeBron James (11)
| Pepsi Center 19,263
| 2–3
|- style="background:#cfc;"
| 6
| November 10
7:00 pm
| New Orleans
| 
| LeBron James (32)
| LeBron James (11)
| James & Irving (9)
| Quicken Loans Arena  20,562
| 3–3
|- style="background:#cfc;"
| 7
| November 14
7:30 pm
| @ Boston
|  
| LeBron James (41)
| Kevin Love (15)
| LeBron James (7)
| TD Garden  18,624
| 4–3
|- style="background:#cfc;"
| 8
| November 15
7:30 pm
| Atlanta
| 
| LeBron James (32)
| Anderson Varejão (10)
| Dion Waiters (8)
| Quicken Loans Arena  20,562
| 5–3
|- style="background:#fcc;"
| 9
| November 17
7:00 pm
| Denver
| 
| LeBron James (22)
| Kevin Love (11)
| Kyrie Irving (8)
| Quicken Loans Arena 20,562
| 5–4
|- style="background:#fcc;"
| 10
| November 19
7:00 pm
| San Antonio
| 
| Anderson Varejão (23)
| Love & Varejão (11)
| LeBron James (9)
| Quicken Loans Arena 20,562
| 5–5
|- style="background:#fcc;"
| 11
| November 21
8:00 pm
| @ Washington
| 
| James & Irving (22)
| Anderson Varejão (9)
| LeBron James (4)
| Verizon Center 20,356
| 5–6
|- style="background:#fcc;"
| 12
| November 22
7:30 pm
| Toronto
| 
| Kevin Love (23)
| Anderson Varejão (12)
| LeBron James (10)
| Quicken Loans Arena 20,562
| 5–7
|- style="background:#cfc;"
| 13
| November 24
7:00 pm
| Orlando
| 
| LeBron James (29)
| Tristan Thompson (11)
| LeBron James (11)
| Quicken Loans Arena 20,562
| 6–7
|- style="background:#cfc;"
| 14
| November 26
7:00 pm
| Washington
| 
| LeBron James (29)
| LeBron James (10)
| LeBron James (8)
| Quicken Loans Arena 20,562
| 7–7
|- style="background:#cfc;"
| 15
| November 29
7:30 pm
| Indiana
| 
| Kevin Love (28)
| Tristan Thompson (11)
| LeBron James (7)
| Quicken Loans Arena 20,562
| 8–7

|- style="background:#cfc;"
| 16
| December 2
7:00 pm
| Milwaukee
| 
| Kyrie Irving (28)
| Kevin Love (11)
| LeBron James (10)
| Quicken Loans Arena 20,562
| 9–7
|- style="background:#cfc;"
| 17
| December 4
8:00 pm
| @ New York
| 
| Kyrie Irving (37)
| Kevin Love (11)
| LeBron James (12)
| Madison Square Garden 19,812
| 10–7
|- style="background:#cfc;"
| 18
| December 5
7:30 pm
| @ Toronto
| 
| LeBron James (24)
| Tristan Thompson (14)
| LeBron James (13)
| Air Canada Centre 20,077
| 11–7
|- style="background:#cfc;"
| 19
| December 8
7:30 pm
| @ Brooklyn
| 
| Dion Waiters (26)
| Love & Varejão (14)
| LeBron James (7)
| Barclays Center 17,732
| 12–7
|- style="background:#cfc;"
| 20
| December 9
7:00 pm
| Toronto
| 
| LeBron James (35)
| Kevin Love (9)
| Kyrie Irving (10)
| Quicken Loans Arena 20,562
| 13–7
|- style="background:#fcc;"
| 21
|December 11
8:00 pm
|@ Oklahoma City
| 
| Kevin Love (26)
| Kevin Love (7)
| Kevin Love (8)
| Chesapeake Energy Arena 18,203
| 13–8
|- style="background:#fcc;"
|22
|December 12
8:00 pm
| @ New Orleans
| 
| LeBron James (41)
| Tristan Thompson (10)
| Kyrie Irving (7)
| Smoothie King Center 18,069
| 13–9
|- style="background:#cfc;"
|23
|December 15
7:00 pm
| Charlotte
| 
| LeBron James (27)
| Kevin Love (18)
| LeBron James (13)
| Quicken Loans Arena 20,562
| 14–9
|- style="background:#fcc;"
|24
|December 17
7:00 pm
| Atlanta
| 
| James & Waiters (21)
| Kevin Love (10)
| Love & Irving (6)
|Quicken Loans Arena 20,562
| 14–10
|- style="background:#cfc;"
|25
|December 19
7:30 pm
| Brooklyn
| 
| LeBron James (22)
| Kevin Love (14)
| LeBron James (9)
|Quicken Loans Arena 20,562
| 15–10
|- style="background:#cfc;"
|26
|December 21
4:30 pm
| Memphis
| 
| LeBron James (25)
| Kevin Love (8)
| James & Irving (11)
|Quicken Loans Arena 20,562
| 16–10
|- style="background:#cfc;"
|27
|December 23
7:00 pm
| Minnesota
| 
| Kyrie Irving (29)
| Kevin Love (10)
| Love, Irving & Waiters (4)
| Quicken Loans Arena 20,562
| 17–10
|- style="background:#fcc;"
|28
|December 25
5:00 pm
| @ Miami
| 
| LeBron James (30)
| Tristan Thompson (9)
| LeBron James (8)
| American Airlines Arena 19,817
| 17–11
|- style="background:#cfc;"
|29
|December 26
7:00 pm
| @ Orlando
| 
| LeBron James (29)
| Tristan Thompson (13)
| LeBron James (8)
| Amway Center 18,846
|18–11
|- style="background:#fcc;"
|30
|December 28
4:30 pm
| Detroit
| 
| Kevin Love (20)
| Tristan Thompson (11)
| LeBron James (7)
| Quicken Loans Arena20,562
| 18–12
|- style="background:#fcc;"
|31
|December 30
7:30 pm
| @ Atlanta
| 
| Kyrie Irving (35)
| Tristan Thompson (13)
| Kyrie Irving (9)
| Philips Arena19,215
| 18–13
|- style="background:#fcc;"
|32
|December 31
7:00 pm
| Milwaukee
| 
| Kyrie Irving (25)
| Tristan Thompson (13)
| Matthew Dellavedova (4)
| Quicken Loans Arena20,562
| 18–14

|- style="background:#cfc;"
| 33
| January 2
7:00 pm
| @ Charlotte
| 
| Kevin Love (27)
| Tristan Thompson (14)
| Miller & Dellavedova (4)
| Time Warner Cable Arena19,307
| 19–14
|- style="background:#fcc;"
| 34
| January 4
1:00 pm
| Dallas
| 
| Kevin Love (30)
| Tristan Thompson (11)
| Matthew Dellavedova (7)
| Quicken Loans Arena20,562
| 19–15
|- style="background:#fcc;"
| 35
| January 5
7:00 pm
| @ Philadelphia
| 
| Kevin Love (28)
| Kevin Love (19)
| Matthew Dellavedova (8)
| Wells Fargo Center17,771
| 19–16
|- style="background:#fcc;"
| 36
| January 7
7:00 pm
| Houston
| 
| Kyrie Irving (38)
| Kevin Love (16)
| Matthew Dellavedova (5)
| Quicken Loans Arena20,562
| 19–17
|- style="background:#fcc;"
| 37
| January 9
10:30 pm
| @ Golden State
| 
| J. R. Smith (27)
| Kevin Love (14)
| Kyrie Irving (5)
| Oracle Arena19,596
| 19–18
|- style="background:#fcc;"
| 38
| January 11
9:00 pm
| @ Sacramento
| 
| Kevin Love (25)
| Timofey Mozgov (12)
| Kyrie Irving (7)
| Sleep Train Arena16,143
| 19–19
|- style="background:#fcc;"
| 39
| January 13
9:00 pm
| @ Phoenix
| 
| LeBron James (33)
| Shawn Marion (11)
| Kyrie Irving (6)
| US Airways Center16,819
| 19–20
|- style="background:#cfc;"
| 40
| January 15
10:30 pm
| @ L.A. Lakers
| 
| LeBron James (36)
| Tristan Thompson (11)
| LeBron James (5)
| Staples Center18,997
| 20–20
|- style="background:#cfc;"
| 41
| January 16
10:30 pm
| @ L.A. Clippers
| 
| Kyrie Irving (37)
| Tristan Thompson (12)
| LeBron James (7)
| Staples Center19,380
| 21–20
|- style="background:#cfc;"
| 42
| January 19
7:30 pm
| Chicago
| 
| LeBron James (26)
| Timofey Mozgov (15)
| Kyrie Irving (12)
| Quicken Loans Arena20,562
| 22–20
|- style="background:#cfc;"
| 43
| January 21
7:00 pm
| Utah
| 
| LeBron James (26)
| Kevin Love (13)
| LeBron James (9)
| Quicken Loans Arena20,562
| 23–20
|- style="background:#cfc;"
| 44
| January 23
7:30 pm
| Charlotte
| 
| LeBron James (25)
| Timofey Mozgov (10)
| LeBron James (9)
| Quicken Loans Arena20,562
| 24–20
|- style="background:#cfc;"
| 45
| January 25
3:30 pm
| Oklahoma City
| 
| LeBron James (34)
| Kevin Love (13)
| Kyrie Irving (6)
| Quicken Loans Arena20,562
| 25–20
|- style="background:#cfc;"
| 46
| January 27
7:30 pm
| @ Detroit
| 
| Kyrie Irving (38)
| Tristan Thompson (12)
| LeBron James (7)
| The Palace of Auburn Hills18,178
| 26–20
|- style="background:#cfc;"
| 47
| January 28
7:00 pm
| Portland
| 
| Kyrie Irving (55)
| Kevin Love (12)
| Kyrie Irving (5)
| Quicken Loans Arena20,562
| 27–20
|- style="background:#cfc;"
| 48
| January 30
7:30 pm
| Sacramento
| 
| Kevin Love (23)
| Kevin Love (10)
| LeBron James (7)
| Quicken Loans Arena20,562
| 28–20
|- style="background:#cfc;"
| 49
| January 31
8:00 pm
| @ Minnesota
| 
| LeBron James (36)
| Kevin Love (17)
| LeBron James (5)
| Target Center 19,356
| 29–20

|- style="background:#cfc;"
| 50
| February 2
7:00 pm
| Philadelphia
| 
| Kyrie Irving (24)
| Kevin Love (15)
| LeBron James (11)
| Quicken Loans Arena20,562
| 30–20
|- style="background:#cfc;"
| 51
| February 5
8:00 pm
| L.A. Clippers
| 
| Kevin Love (24)
| Tristan Thompson (10)
| LeBron James (9)
| Quicken Loans Arena20,562
| 31–20
|- style="background:#fcc;"
| 52
| February 6
7:00 pm
| @ Indiana
| 
| Kyrie Irving (29)
| Timofey Mozgov (9)
| James & Irving (5)
| Bankers Life Fieldhouse18,165
| 31–21
|- style="background:#cfc;"
| 53
| February 8
3:30 pm
| L.A. Lakers
| 
| Kevin Love (32)
| Kevin Love (10)
| Kyrie Irving (10)
| Quicken Loans Arena20,562
| 32–21
|- style="background:#cfc;"
| 54
| February 11
8:00 pm
| Miami
| 
| Timofey Mozgov (20)
| LeBron James (10)
| James & Smith (7)
| Quicken Loans Arena20,562
| 33–21
|- style="background:#fcc;"
| 55
| February 12
8:00 pm
| @ Chicago
| 
| LeBron James (31)
| Timofey Mozgov (11)
| Kyrie Irving (7)
| United Center21,920
| 33–22
|- style="text-align:center;"
| colspan="9" style="background:#bbcaff;" | All-Star Break
|- style="background:#cfc;"
| 56
| February 20
8:00 pm
| @ Washington
| 
| LeBron James (28)
| Tristan Thompson (9)
| Kyrie Irving (7)
| Verizon Center21,920
| 34–22
|- style="background:#cfc;"
| 57
| February 22
1:00 pm
| @ New York
| 
| James & Irving (18)
| Kevin Love (16)
| James & Shumpert (7)
| Madison Square Garden19,812
| 35–22
|- style="background:#cfc;"
| 58
| February 24
7:30 pm
| @ Detroit
| 
| Kevin Love (24)
| Kevin Love (9)
| LeBron James (11)
| The Palace of Auburn Hills19,087
| 36–22
|- style="background:#cfc;"
| 59
| February 26
8:00 pm
| Golden State
| 
| LeBron James (42)
| LeBron James (11)
| James & Smith (5)
| Quicken Loans Arena20,562
| 37–22
|- style="background:#fcc;"
| 60
| February 27
7:00 pm
| @ Indiana
| 
| J. R. Smith (21)
| Love, Dellavedova & Shumpert (10)
| Matthew Dellavedova (5)
| Bankers Life Fieldhouse18,165
| 37–23
|-

|- style="background:#fcc;"
| 61
| March 1
3:30 pm
| @ Houston
| 
| LeBron James (37)
| Tristan Thompson (19)
| James, Smith & Dellavedova (4)
| Toyota Center18,345
| 37–24
|- style="background:#cfc;"
| 62
| March 3
7:00 pm
| Boston
| 
| LeBron James (27)
| Kevin Love (8)
| Matthew Dellavedova (7)
| Quicken Loans Arena20,562
| 38–24
|- style="background:#cfc;"
| 63
| March 4
7:30 pm
| @ Toronto
| 
| LeBron James (29)
| Kevin Love (10)
| LeBron James (14)
| Air Canada Centre19,800
| 39–24
|- style="background:#fcc;"
| 64
| March 6
7:30 pm
| @ Atlanta
| 
| Kyrie Irving (20)
| Kevin Love (8)
| LeBron James (8)
| Philips Arena19,244
| 39–25
|- style="background:#cfc;"
| 65
| March 7
7:30 pm
| Phoenix
| 
| Timofey Mozgov (19)
| Tristan Thompson (12)
| LeBron James (8)
| Quicken Loans Arena20,562
| 40-25
|- style="background:#cfc;"
| 66
| March 10
8:30 pm
| @ Dallas
| 
| LeBron James (27)
| Kevin Love (14)
| LeBron James (8)
| American Airlines Center20,501
| 41–25
|- style="background:#cfc;"
| 67
| March 12
9:30 pm
| @ San Antonio
| 
| Kyrie Irving (57)
| Tristan Thompson (7)
| LeBron James (9)
| AT&T Center18,581
| 42–25
|- style="background:#cfc;"
| 68
| March 15
6:00 pm
| @ Orlando
| 
| Kyrie Irving (33)
| LeBron James (8)
| LeBron James (13)
| Amway Center17,786
| 43–25
|- style="background:#fcc;"
| 69
| March 16
8:00 pm
| @ Miami
| 
| LeBron James (26)
| Tristan Thompson (8)
| Kyrie Irving (6)
| American Airlines Arena19,626
| 43–26
|- style="background:#cfc;"
| 70
| March 18
7:00 pm
| Brooklyn
| 
| Mozgov & Smith (17)
| Kevin Love (11)
| Kyrie Irving (10)
| Quicken Loans Arena20,562
| 44–26
|- style="background:#cfc;"
| 71
| March 20
7:30 pm
| Indiana
| 
| LeBron James (29)
| Kevin Love (13)
| James & Dellavedova (5)
| Quicken Loans Arena20,562
| 45–26
|- style="background:#cfc;"
| 72
| March 22
3:00 pm
| @ Milwaukee
| 
| LeBron James (28)
| LeBron James (10)
| Kyrie Irving (7)
| BMO Harris Bradley Center16,687
| 46–26
|- style="background:#cfc;"
| 73
| March 25
8:00 pm
| @ Memphis
| 
| Kyrie Irving (24)
| Tristan Thompson (11)
| J. R. Smith (6)
| FedExForum18,119
| 47–26
|- style="background:#fcc;"
| 74
| March 27
7:30 pm
| @ Brooklyn
| 
| Kyrie Irving (26)
| Tristan Thompson (9)
| LeBron James (9)
| Barclays Center17,732
| 47–27
|- style="background:#cfc;"
| 75
| March 29
4:30 pm
| Philadelphia
| 
| LeBron James (20)
| LeBron James (11)
| LeBron James (6)
| Quicken Loans Arena20,562
| 48–27
|-

|- style="background:#cfc;"
| 76
| April 2
8:00 pm
| Miami
| 
| James & Irving (23)
| Tristan Thompson (15)
| LeBron James (7)
| Quicken Loans Arena20,562
| 49–27
|- style="background:#cfc;"
| 77
| April 5
3:30 pm
| Chicago
| 
| Kyrie Irving (27)
| LeBron James (10)
| LeBron James (12)
| Quicken Loans Arena20,562
| 50–27
|- style="background:#cfc;"
| 78
| April 8
8:00 pm
| @ Milwaukee
| 
| Kyrie Irving (27)
| Kevin Love (11)
| Kyrie Irving (9)
| BMO Harris Bradley Center14,629
| 51–27
|- style="background:#fcc;"
| 79
| April 10
7:30 pm
| Boston
| 
| Kevin Love (19)
| Tristan Thompson (12)
| Matthew Dellavedova (8)
| Quicken Loans Arena20,562
| 51–28
|- style="background:#fcc;"
| 80
| April 12
3:00 pm
| @ Boston
| 
| Iman Shumpert (15)
| Iman Shumpert (10)
| Matthew Dellavedova (9)
| TD Garden18,624
| 51–29
|- style="background:#cfc;"
| 81
| April 13
7:00 pm
| Detroit
| 
| J. R. Smith (28)
| Timofey Mozgov (13)
| LeBron James (11)
| Quicken Loans Arena20,562
| 52–29
|- style="background:#cfc;"
| 82
| April 15
8:00 pm
| Washington
| 
| Kevin Love (19)
| Shawn Marion (9)
| Matthew Dellavedova (12)
| Quicken Loans Arena 20,562
| 53–29

Detailed records

Playoffs

|- style="background:#bfb;"
| 1
| April 19
3:00 pm
| Boston
| 
| Kyrie Irving (30)
| Kevin Love (12)
| LeBron James (7)
| Quicken Loans Arena20,562
| 1–0
|- style="background:#bfb;"
| 2
| April 21
7:00 pm
| Boston
| 
| LeBron James (30)
| Tristan Thompson (11)
| LeBron James  (7)
| Quicken Loans Arena20,562
| 2–0
|- style="background:#bfb;"
| 3
| April 23
7:00 pm
| @ Boston
| 
| LeBron James (31)
| LeBron James (11)
| Kyrie Irving (6)
| TD Garden18,624
| 3–0
|- style="background:#bfb;"
| 4
| April 26
1:00 pm
| @ Boston
| 
| LeBron James (27)
| Mozgov & Irving (11)
| LeBron James (8)
| TD Garden18,624
| 4–0

|- style="background:#fbb;"
| 1
| May 4
7:00 pm
| Chicago
| 
| Kyrie Irving (30)
| LeBron James (15)
| Kyrie Irving (6)
| Quicken Loans Arena20,562
| 0–1
|- style="background:#bfb;"
| 2
| May 6
7:00 pm
| Chicago
| 
| LeBron James (33)
| Tristan Thompson (12)
| Matthew Dellavedova (9)
| Quicken Loans Arena20,562
| 1–1
|- style="background:#fbb;"
| 3
| May 8
8:00 pm
| @ Chicago
| 
| LeBron James (27)
| Tristan Thompson (13)
| LeBron James (14)
| United Center22,246
| 1–2
|- style="background:#bfb;"
| 4
| May 10
3:30 pm
| @ Chicago
| 
| LeBron James (25)
| LeBron James (14)
| LeBron James (8)
| United Center22,256
| 2–2
|- style="background:#bfb;"
| 5
| May 12
7:00 pm
| Chicago
| 
| LeBron James (38)
| LeBron James (12)
| LeBron James (6)
| Quicken Loans Arena20,562
| 3–2
|- style="background:#bfb;"
| 6
| May 14
8:00 pm
| @ Chicago
| 
| Matthew Dellavedova (19)
| Tristan Thompson (17)
| LeBron James (11)
| United Center22,695
| 4–2

|- style="background:#bfb;"
| 1
| May 20
8:30 pm
| @ Atlanta
| 
| LeBron James (31)
| Timofey Mozgov (11)
| Irving & James (6)
| Philips Arena18,489
| 1–0
|- style="background:#bfb;"
| 2
| May 22
8:30 pm
| @ Atlanta
| 
| LeBron James (30)
| Tristan Thompson (16)
| LeBron James (11)
| Philips Arena18,670
| 2–0
|- style="background:#bfb;"
| 3
| May 24
8:30 pm
| Atlanta
| 
| LeBron James (37)
| LeBron James (18)
| LeBron James (13)
| Quicken Loans Arena20,562
| 3–0
|- style="background:#bfb;"
| 4
| May 26
8:30 pm
| Atlanta
| 
| LeBron James (23)
| Tristan Thompson (11)
| LeBron James (7)
| Quicken Loans Arena20,562
| 4–0

|- style="background:#fbb;"
| 1
| June 4
| @ Golden State
| 
| LeBron James (44)
| Tristan Thompson (15)
| Kyrie Irving (6)LeBron James (6)
| Oracle Arena19,596
| 0–1
|- style="background:#bfb;"
| 2
| June 7
| @ Golden State
| 
| LeBron James (39)
| LeBron James (16)
| LeBron James (11)
| Oracle Arena19,596
| 1–1
|- style="background:#bfb;"
| 3
| June 9
| Golden State
| 
| LeBron James (40)
| Tristan Thompson (13)
| LeBron James (8)
| Quicken Loans Arena20,562
| 2–1
|- style="background:#fbb;"
| 4
| June 11
| Golden State
| 
| Timofey Mozgov (28)
| Tristan Thompson (13)
| LeBron James (8)
| Quicken Loans Arena20,562
| 2–2
|- style="background:#fbb;"
| 5
| June 14
| @ Golden State
| 
| LeBron James (40)
| LeBron James (14)
| LeBron James (11)
| Oracle Arena19,596
| 2–3
|- style="background:#fbb;"
| 6
| June 16
| Golden State
| 
|| LeBron James (32)
| LeBron James (18)
| LeBron James (9)
| Quicken Loans Arena20,562
| 2–4
|- style="background:#fcc;"

Player statistics

Summer League

|-
| 
| 4
| 4
| 29.8
| .426
| .250
| .600
| 7.8
| 0.8
| 0.8
| 0.0
| 13.3
|-
| 
| 5
| 2
| 25.2
| .251
| .235
| .714
| 4.0
| 3.0
| 0.2
| 0.0
| 12.8
|-
| 
| 5
| 4
| 16.0
| .615
| .000
| .500
| 4.4
| 0.2
| 0.4
| 0.2
| 7.4
|-
| 
| 3
| 3
| 32.0
| .435
| .273
| .800
| 4.7
| 4.7
| 1.0
| 0.0
| 11.7
|-
| 
| 5
| 0
| 14.8
| .647
| .000
| .824
| 3.6
| 0.4
| 0.6
| 1.2
| 7.2
|-
| 
| 5
| 1
| 14.2
| .471
| .444
| .667
| 3.0
| 0.6
| 0.8
| 0.2
| 4.4
|-
| 
| 4
| 0
| 9.3
| .364
| .200
| .000
| 1.3
| 1.0
| 0.2
| 0.0
| 2.3
|-
| 
| 4
| 0
| 13.3
| .375
| .313
| .600
| 1.3
| 1.5
| 0.2
| 0.0
| 6.5
|-
| 
| 4
| 4
| 24.8
| .391
| .400
| .818
| 1.5
| 1.5
| 0.5
| 0.2
| 7.8
|-
| 
| 1
| 1
| 14.0
| .500
| .500
| 1.000
| 1.0
| 1.0
| 0.0
| 0.0
| 7.0
|-
| 
| 1
| 1
| 34.0
| .444
| .500
| .500
| 4.0
| 3.0
| 1.0
| 0.0
| 11.0
|-
| 
| 5
| 1
| 15.4
| .524
| .000
| .667
| 3.4
| 0.4
| 0.6
| 0.4
| 5.2
|-
| 
| 3
| 1
| 11.3
| .500
| .000
| 1.000
| 3.7
| 0.7
| 0.3
| 0.3
| 5.0
|-
| 
| 4
| 4
| 30.0
| .405
| .154
| .703
| 3.5
| 0.3
| 1.2
| 1.5
| 15.5
|-
! Totals
! —
! —
! 200
! .469
! .272
! .725
! 35.8
! 12.0
! 5.8
! 3.6
! 84.6
|}

Preseason

|-
| 
| 5
| 0
| 6.7
| .300
| .000
| .000
| 2.6
| 0.0
| 0.2
| 0.2
| 1.2
|-
| 
| 6
| 3
| 27.2
| .433
| .294
| .000
| 3.0
| 4.33
| 0 67
| 0.0
| 5.17
|-
| 
| 5
| 0
| 6.5
| .200
| .000
| 1.000
| 1.4
| 0.2
| 0.2
| 0.0
| 1.0
|-
| 
| 5
| 0
| 17.5
| .364
| .381
| 1.000
| 2.2
| 2.0
| 0.4
| 0.0
| 7.4
|-
| 
| 3
| 1
| 10.2
| .400
| .000
| 1.000
| 2.33
| 0.33
| 0.33
| 1.00
| 3.67
|-
| 
| 3
| 2
| 27.3
| .538
| .455
| 1.000
| 2.0
| 5.0
| 1.5
| 1.5
| 19.5
|-
| 
| 5
| 4
| 22.6
| .486
| .462
| .750
| 3.25
| 4.75
| 0.5
| 0.25
| 14.25
|-
| 
| 3
| 0
| 9.5
| .500
| .600
| 1.000
| 0.33
| 0.33
| 0.0
| 0.0
| 4.00
|-
| 
| 4
| 0
| 15.4
| .412
| .000
| 1.000
| 3.0
| 0.25
| 0.0
| 1.0
| 5.5
|-
| 
| 5
| 4
| 21.8
| .571
| .588
| .772
| 6.5
| 2.25
| 0.25
| 0.0
| 15.75
|-
| 
| 5
| 1
| 20.1
| .333
| .000
| .750
| 4.75
| 0.75
| 0.75
| 0.5
| 5.00
|-
| 
| 6
| 0
| 14.2
| .263
| .188
| 1.000
| 1.8
| 1.4
| 0.2
| 0.2
| 3.4
|-
| 
| 5
| 0
| 13.5
| .517
| .421
| .750
| 1.4
| 1.0
| 0.0
| 0.0
| 8.2
|-
| 
| 5
| 2
| 25.1
| .588
| .000
| .789
| 10.5
| 1.0
| 1.0
| 0.5
| 13.75
|-
| 
| 5
| 3
| 20.9
| .542
| .000
| .700
| 7.25
| 1.25
| 1.5
| 0.25
| 8.25
|-
| 
| 6
| 5
| 27.1
| .426
| .385
| .800
| 2.8
| 2.6
| 0.2
| 0.6
| 15.2
|}

Regular season

|
| 69 || 69|| 36.1 || .488 || .354 || .710 || 6.0 || 7.4 || 1.6 || 0.7 || 25.3
|-
|
| 75 || 75 || 36.4 || .468 || .415 || .863 || 3.2 || 5.2 || 1.5 || 0.3 || 21.7
|-
|
| 75 || 75 || 33.8 || .434 || .367 || .804 || 9.7 || 2.2 || 0.7 || 0.5 || 16.4
|-
|
| 46 || 45 || 31.8 || .425 || .390 || .818 || 3.5 || 2.5 || 1.4 || 0.4 || 12.7
|-
|
| 46 || 45 || 25.0 || .590 || .000 || .787 || 6.9 || 0.8 || 0.4 || 1.2 || 10.6
|-
|
| 33 || 3 || 23.8 || .404 || .256 || .783 || 1.7 || 2.2 || 1.3 || 0.3 || 10.5
|-
|
| 26 || 26 || 24.5 || .555 || .000 || .733 || 6.5 || 1.3 || 1.1 || 0.6 || 9.8
|-
|
| 82 || 15 || 26.8 || .547 || .000 || .641 || 8.0 || 0.5 || 0.4 || 0.7 || 8.5
|-
|
| 38 || 1 || 24.2 || .410 || .338 || .667 || 3.8 || 1.5 || 1.3 || 0.3 || 7.2
|-
|
| 67 || 13 || 20.6 || .362 || .407 || .763 || 1.9 || 3.0 || 0.4 || 0 || 4.8
|-
|
| 57 || 24 || 19.3 || .446 || .261 || .765 || 3.5 || 0.9 || 0.5 || 0.5 || 4.8
|-
|
| 57 || 2 || 11.7 || .368 || .360 || .848 || 1.1 || 0.4 || 0.2 || 0.1 || 4.4
|-
|
| 51 || 1 || 9.7 || .400 || .369 || .600 || 0.8 || 0.5 || 0.1 || 0 || 2.7
|-
|
| 17 || 0 || 9.8 || .488 || .000 || .500 || 2.4 || 0.5 || 0.1 || 0.2 || 2.6
|-
|
| 52 || 15 || 13.5 || .325 || .327 || .750 || 1.8 || 0.9 || 0.3 || 0.1 || 2.1
|-
|
| 11 || 0 || 7.9 || .265 || .000 || .667 || 1.4 || 1.2 || 0.3 || 0 || 2.0
|-
|
| 8 || 0 || 8.6 || .263 || .222 || .500 || 0.6 || 1.0 || 0.8 || 0.1 || 1.9
|-
|
| 22 || 1 || 5.4 || .467 || .000 || .538 || 1.3 || 0.1 || 0.1 || 0.5 || 1.6
|-
|
| 12 || 0 || 6.6 || .333 || .000 || .600 || 1.7 || 0.4 || 0.1 || 0 || 0.9
|-
|
| 5 || 0 || 2.8 || .250 || .000 || 1.000 || 0.2 || 0.2 || 0 || 0 || 0.8
|}

Records
 On March 12, Kyrie Irving set a Cavaliers franchise record with 57 points in an overtime victory against the San Antonio Spurs. It was also the first time in Gregg Popovich's coaching career that an opposing player has scored 50 points against his team.
 On May 24, LeBron James became the first player in NBA history to put up 37+ points, 18+ rebounds, and 13+ assists in a playoff game. He achieved the feat in an overtime win against the Atlanta Hawks in Game 3 of the Eastern Conference Finals.
 On May 26, LeBron James and James Jones became the first players to reach five consecutive NBA Finals since several Boston Celtics accomplished the feat in 1966. James and Jones are the first to do so with two teams (also with the Miami Heat).

References

External links

 2014–15 Cleveland Cavaliers preseason at ESPN
 2014–15 Cleveland Cavaliers regular season at ESPN

Cleveland Cavaliers seasons
Cleveland
Eastern Conference (NBA) championship seasons
2014 in sports in Ohio
2015 in sports in Ohio